Greensleeves Rhythm Album #85: Inspector is an album in Greensleeves Records' rhythm album series. It was released July 2006 on CD and LP. The album features various artists recorded over the "Inspector" riddim produced by Damani "DJ Karim" Thompson for Stainless Records.

Track listing
"Haffi Get It (Nah Rape)" - Sizzla
"Real Gangsters" - Elephant Man
"Uptown Story" - Supahype
"My Highness" - Busy Signal
"Nah Switch" - Vybz Kartel
"Champion" - Lady Saw
"Sitten Tight" - Mad Cobra
"Far We Come From" - Bounty Killer
"We Don't Play" - Mavado
"Who?" - Vybz Kartel ft. Supahype
"We A Gangsta" - Dr. Evil
"Unpredictable" - Bling Dawg
"Weed We Smoke" - Kid Kurrupt
"We Nuh Play" - Ward 21
"Gimme The Girls" - Icecold
"Nah Taste" - Macka Diamond
"Badman Story" - Zumjay
"Calling All Girls" - Monster Twins
"Turn Up The Bassline" - Munga & Jah Melo
"Wooo!!!!" - Jagwa
"Informer" - Tornado
"Oh Yeah" - Tanto Marijuanna
"Inspector Rhythm" - DJ Karim

References

2003 compilation albums
Reggae compilation albums
Greensleeves Records albums